Mount Chudalup is a  high granite outcrop in the D'Entrecasteaux National Park, on the way to Windy Harbour from Northcliffe, in Western Australia.

References 

Rock formations of Western Australia
D'Entrecasteaux National Park